Toufiq M. Seraj (1956 – June 20, 2019) was a Bangladeshi businessman who was the founder and managing director of Sheltech and its associated companies. He was the first president of Real Estate and Housing Association of Bangladesh (REHAB) for three consecutive terms (2000–2006). Seraj was also a president of Bangladesh Institute of Planners (2006-8) and Bangladesh Tennis Federation.

Early life and education
Seraj was born in 1956. He completed graduation and post-graduation from Bangladesh University of Engineering and Technology. Later he earned his PhD in civic design from the University of Liverpool.

Career 
Seraj taught at Bangladesh University of Engineering and Technology. He was president of the Bangladesh Institute of Planners. He was founding managing director of Sheltech. He served as the founding president of Real Estate and Housing Association of Bangladesh. He was the president of Bangladesh Tennis Federation.

Personal life
Seraj was married to Zeba Islam Seraj, a professor at the Department of Biochemistry and Molecular Biology, University of Dhaka. They had two daughters, Saamiya and Sarah Seraj.

Death 
Seraj died on 20 June 2019, aged 63, of a massive heart attack in the aeroplane lavatory whilst on route from Dhaka to Barcelona, Spain, with a stopover in Doha. His body was flown back to Dhaka from Doha Airport.

References

External links
Sheltech website

1956 births
Alumni of the University of Liverpool
Bangladeshi businesspeople
2019 deaths
Bangladesh University of Engineering and Technology alumni